The Tulsa Pride was an American soccer club based in Tulsa, Oklahoma that was a member of the Lone Star Soccer Alliance.

Year-by-year

Defunct soccer clubs in Oklahoma
Lone Star Soccer Alliance teams